Dajković is a Montenegrin surname. Notable people with the surname include:

 , Orthodox Vladika of Montenegro (1961–1990)

Serbian surnames
Montenegrin surnames